France competed at the 1928 Summer Olympics in Amsterdam, Netherlands. 255 competitors, 219 men and 36 women, took part in 112 events in 17 sports. At the beginning of the games there was an incident where a French coach was physically assaulted by a Stadium gatekeeper who refused him entry. It boiled over to a point where the entire French team did not participate in the Parade of Nations, and conversations were made to pull out of the games completely. However, the issue was resolved and France went on to compete.

Medalists

Aquatics

Diving

Four divers, 3 men and 1 woman, represented France in 1928. It was the nation's third appearance in the sport. None of the French divers placed in the top 3 in their preliminary round groups to advance to the final; 3 out of the 5 opportunities, they came in 4th to just miss qualification.

Swimming

13 swimmers, 7 women and 6 men, represented France in 1928. It was the nation's 6th appearance in the sport (having not competed in swimming in 1896 or 1904). The women's relay was the only swimmer or team to advance to an event final, placing 5th in a repeat of their 1924 performance. Pélégry had been a member of the 1924 relay as well. Stoffel, Klein, and Zeibig were other swimmers who had competed in 1924.

Water polo

France, the defending gold medalist, competed in the men's water polo tournament for the fifth time. The French squad won its first two matches before being defeated by Hungary in the semifinals. Due to misunderstanding of the Bergvall system under which the tournament was meant to be played, France then faced Great Britain, the United States, and Argentina (winning all three games). The match against Great Britain is treated as the bronze medal match here.

Summary

 Men's tournament

 Team roster

 Round of 16

 Quarterfinals

 Semifinals

 Bronze medal match

Athletics

50 athletes, 41 men and 9 women, represented France in 1928. It was the nation's 7th appearance in the sport as well as the Games. The French athletics team won 3 medals, one of each color. Boughera El Ouafi won the gold medal in the men's marathon, France's first gold medal in the sport since 1920. Jules Ladoumègue took silver in the men's 1500 metres. Claude Ménard earned bronze in the men's high jump.

 Track and road events

 Field events

Boxing

Eight boxers, all men, represented France in 1928. It was the nation's fourth appearance in the sport. France was one of 7 nations to have the maximum numbers of boxers, one per weight class. Apell won the French boxing team's only medal, a silver in the flyweight. Galataud also advanced to the semifinals, but lost there and in the bronze medal bout to finish 4th.

Cycling

Eight cyclists, all men, represented France in 1928. It was the nation's seventh appearance in the sport. Roger Beaufrand won France's only cycling medal in 1928, the gold medal in the sprint.

Road cycling

Track cycling

 Time trial

 Match races

Equestrian

Nine equestrians, the maximum possible, represented France in 1928. It was the nation's fifth appearance in the sport. Charles Marion (dressage) and Pierre Bertran de Balanda (jumping) won individual silver medals.

Dressage

Eventing

Jumping

Fencing

20 fencers, 17 men and 3 women, represented France in 1928. It was the nation's sixth appearance in the sport. French fencers won two gold medals and three silvers, the most successful nation in the sport for the second consecutive Games. Lucien Gaudin and Georges Buchard took the top two places in the men's individual épée, with Buchard also part of the silver-medal winning men's épée team. Roger Ducret, the star of 1924 with five medals, was part of that épée team for his only medal in 1928. Gaudin won another gold medal in the men's individual foil, as well as competing on the silver-medal men's foil team.  The French women, just as in 1924, all failed to reach the final.

Football

Summary

 Men's tournament

France competed in men's football for the fifth time in 1928. The team lost its first match against Italy, 4–3, and were eliminated from the single-elimination tournament.

Team roster

Round of 16

Gymnastics

Artistic gymnastics

Twenty gymnasts, 8 men and 12 women, competed for France in 1928. It was the nation's seventh appearance in the sport, having not competed in gymnastics only in 1904. France was one of 5 nation's to send women to the first Olympic women's gymnastics competition. The French men's team placed 4th of 11, while the women's team finished 5th of 5. None of the individual gymnasts won any medals; it was the first time since 1896 that France had competed in gymnastics but not won any medals. André Lemoine came closest, with a fourth-place finish in the parallel bars.

Hockey

Summary

Men's tournament

France competed in men's field hockey in 1928, the only nation to have competed in all 3 tournaments to that point. The team went 1–2 in its group, finishing 3rd in pool play and not advancing the gold or bronze medal finals.

 Team roster

 Group play

Modern pentathlon

Three pentathletes, all men, represented France in 1928. It was the nation's fourth appearance in the sport. France was one of five nations to have competed in each edition of the Olympic modern pentathlon to that time.

Rowing

26 rowers, all men, represented France in 1928. It was the nation's fifth appearance in the event. Along with Italy and the United States, France was one of three nations to have a boat in each event (and the maximum number of rowers). French rowers won a single medal, the silver in the coxed pair event.

Sailing

13 sailors, 12 men and 1 woman, represented France in 1928. It was the nation's sixth appearance in the sport; France was the only country to have competed in each edition of the Olympic sailing contests to that point. France had the maximum of 1 boat in each event. The French boat L’Aile VI won the 8 metre class event, claiming first place in 3 of the 7 races (despite not starting one race altogether). In the 6 metre event, Cupidon Viking was unable to finish better than 4th in any of the 4 preliminary races and did not qualify for the final 3 races. Similarly, the French dinghy sailors were unable to qualify for the final series.

 Dinghy

 6 metre and 8 metre classes

Weightlifting

Ten weightlifters, all men, represented France in 1928. France was one of five nations to have the maximum number of weightlifters, with two in each weight class. It was the nation's third appearance in the sport. French weightlifters won a total of three medals, one of each color. Roger François set a new world record in the combined total for the 75 kg weight class, winning the event with 335 kg. Louis Hostin, the silver medalist in the 82.5 kg class, shared new Olympic records with champion El Sayed Nosseir of Egypt in two lifts, the press and the clean & jerk. Jules Meese was one of four men to share the new Olympic record in the press for the 67.5 kg class.

Wrestling

Thirteen wrestlers, all men, represented France in 1928. France was one of three nations (along with Belgium and Finland) to have a wrestler in each weight class. It was the nation's fourth appearance in the sport. French wrestlers won three medals, all in freestyle: one silver and two bronze. They were France's first medals in freestyle wrestling; the nation's only previous medal was in Greco-Roman.

Freestyle wrestling

Greco-Roman wrestling

Art competitions

References

External links
Official Olympic Reports
International Olympic Committee results database

Nations at the 1928 Summer Olympics
1928
Summer Olympics